Juan Hernández López (March 1859 – May 17, 1944) was a Puerto Rican politician, senator, and attorney. He was a member of the Senate from 1921 to 1933, and served as its President pro tempore from 1921 to 1924, under Antonio R. Barceló.

Biography 

Juan Hernández López was born in March 1859 in San Juan, Puerto Rico. He studied in Spain, graduating in 1881. After that, he returned to Puerto Rico to work as an attorney. He joined the Autonomist Party with Román Baldorioty de Castro, and served as one of its secretaries and co-author of its program in 1887.

Hernández collaborated with the newspaper El Clamor del País and defended journalists that were persecuted for political reasons. He also presided the Ateneo Puertorriqueño and was Vice-president of his own party during Luis Muñoz Rivera's presidency in 1897.

Hernández also worked as Secretary of Public Works and Communication in the Autonomic Cabinet of 1898. He was vocal in the Commission organized to review the laws of Puerto Rico upon the installation of the Foraker Act in 1900. Hernández was also a delegate to the House of Representatives in 1903 for the Republican Party, presiding the Judicial Committee. During that time, he was author and co-author of several laws established in the island. From 1904 to 1906, he presided the Republican Party.

In 1920, Hernández was elected to the Senate of Puerto Rico for the District of San Juan. In 1921, he was elected as President pro tempore under Antonio R. Barceló. He was reelected in 1924 and 1928, this time under the Alianza Puertorriqueña party.

After finishing his last term in 1932, Hernández retired from politics to dedicate to his private law practice until his death. Died on May 17, 1944. Was buried at the Puerto Rico Memorial Cemetery in Carolina, Puerto Rico.

See also

List of Puerto Ricans

References

External links
Biografía de Juan Hernández López

1859 births
1944 deaths
People from San Juan, Puerto Rico
Presidents pro tempore of the Senate of Puerto Rico
Members of the Senate of Puerto Rico
Puerto Rican party leaders